Nordic Quartet is an album by English saxophonist John Surman featuring Karin Krog, Terje Rypdal and Vigleik Storaas. Recorded in 1994, it was released by ECM Records.

Reception
The AllMusic review by Scott Yanow stated, "The group never really meshes their disparate voices together and few of the spacey (and sometimes meandering) group originals other than 'Wild Bird' are at all memorable. All of the principals have sounded better elsewhere." The Penguin Guide to Jazz Recordings, however, awards four stars, writing that "there is a compelling logic to the music that overcomes its cool detachment."

Track listing
All compositions by John Surman except as indicated
 "Traces" (Karen Krog, Vigliek Storaas) - 7:14 
 "Unwritten Letter" (Krog, John Surman) - 3:49 
 "Offshore Piper" (Terje Rypdal, Surman) - 2:09 
 "Gone to the Dogs" - 3:58 
 "Double Tripper" (Rypdal, Surman) - 6:18 
 "Ved Sørevatn" (Rypdal) - 8:06 
 "Watching Shadows" (Krog, Surman) - 5:20 
 "The Illusion" (Storaas) - 5:57 
 "Wild Bird" (Krog, Rypdal, Surman) - 7:30 
Recorded at Rainbow Studio in Oslo, Norway in August 1994

Personnel
John Surman – soprano saxophone, baritone saxophone, alto clarinet, bass clarinet
Vigleik Storaas – piano
Terje Rypdal – guitar
Karin Krog – voice

References

ECM Records albums
John Surman albums
1995 albums
Albums produced by Manfred Eicher